The Veil Nebula is a cloud of heated and ionized gas and dust in the constellation Cygnus.

It constitutes the visible portions of the Cygnus Loop, a supernova remnant, many portions of which have acquired their own individual names and catalogue identifiers. The source supernova was a star 20 times more massive than the Sun which exploded between 10,000 and 20,000 years ago. At the time of the explosion, the supernova would have appeared brighter than Venus in the sky, and visible in the daytime. The remnants have since expanded to cover an area of the sky roughly 3 degrees in diameter (about 6 times the diameter, and 36 times the area, of the full Moon). While previous distance estimates have ranged from 1200 to 5800light-years, a recent determination of 2400 light-years is based on direct astrometric measurements. (The distance estimates affect also the estimates of size and age.)

The Hubble Space Telescope captured several images of the nebula. The analysis of the emissions from the nebula indicates the presence of oxygen, sulfur, and hydrogen. The Cygnus Loop is also a strong emitter of radio waves and x-rays.

On 24 September 2015 new images and videos of the Veil Nebula were released by the Space Telescope Science Institute, with an explanation of the images.

Components 

In modern usage, the names Veil Nebula, Cirrus Nebula, and Filamentary Nebula generally refer to all the visible structure of the remnant, or even to the entire loop itself.  The structure is so large that several NGC numbers were assigned to various arcs of the nebula.  There are three main visual components:
 The Western Veil (also known as Caldwell 34), consisting of NGC 6960 (the "Witch's Broom", Lacework Nebula, "Filamentary Nebula") near the foreground star 52 Cygni;
 The Eastern Veil (also known as Caldwell 33), whose brightest area is NGC 6992, trailing off farther south into NGC 6995 (together with NGC 6992 also known as "Network Nebula") and IC 1340; and
 Pickering's Triangle (or Pickering's Triangular Wisp), brightest at the north central edge of the loop, but visible in photographs continuing toward the central area of the loop.

NGC 6974 and NGC 6979 are luminous knots in a fainter patch of nebulosity on the northern rim between NGC 6992 and Pickering's Triangle.

Observation 
The nebula was discovered on 5 September 1784 by William Herschel. He described the western end of the nebula as "Extended; passes thro' 52 Cygni... near 2 degree in length", and described the eastern end as "Branching nebulosity ... The following part divides into several streams uniting again towards the south."

When finely resolved, some parts of the nebula appear to be rope-like filaments. The standard explanation is that the shock waves are so thin, less than one part in 50,000 of the radius, that the shell is visible only when viewed exactly edge-on, giving the shell the appearance of a filament.  At the estimated distance of 2400 light-years, the nebula has a radius of 65 light-years (a diameter of 130 light-years). The thickness of each filament is th of the radius, or about 4 billion miles, roughly the distance from Earth to Pluto.  
Undulations in the surface of the shell lead to multiple filamentary images, which appear to be intertwined.

Even though the nebula has a relatively bright integrated magnitude of 7, it is spread over so large an area that the surface brightness is quite low, so the nebula is notorious among astronomers as being difficult to see. However, an observer can see the nebula clearly in a telescope using an O-III astronomical filter (isolating the wavelength of light from doubly ionized oxygen), as almost all light from this nebula is emitted at this wavelength. An  telescope equipped with an O-III filter shows the delicate lacework apparent in photographs. Smaller telescopes with an O-III filter can show the nebula as well, and some argue that it can be seen without any optical aid except an O-III filter held up to the eye.

The brighter segments of the nebula have the New General Catalogue designations NGC 6960, 6974, 6979, 6992, and 6995. The easiest segment to find is 6960, which runs behind 52 Cygni, a star that can be seen with the naked eye. NGC 6992 & 6995 are objects on the eastern side of the loop which are also relatively easy to see.  NGC 6974 and NGC 6979 are visible as knots in an area of nebulosity along the northern rim. Pickering's Triangle is much fainter and has no NGC number (though 6979 is occasionally used to refer to it). It was discovered photographically in 1904 by Williamina Fleming (after the New General Catalogue was published), but credit went to Edward Charles Pickering, the director of her observatory, as was the custom of the day.

The Veil Nebula is expanding at a velocity of about 1.5 million kilometers per hour. Using images taken by the Hubble Space Telescope between 1997 and 2015, the expansion of the Veil Nebula has been directly observed.

Gallery

See also 
 List of supernova remnants

References

External links 

 IC 1340, photograph –  by David Malin, Australian Astronomical Observatory
 "Uncovering the Veil Nebula" –  spacetelescope.com, with several Hubble Space Telescope photos
 APOD (2010-11-19) – Nebulae in the Northern Cross, showing Veil Nebula to scale in Cygnus
 APOD (2010-09-16) – Photo of the entire Veil Nebula
 APOD (2009-12-01) – NGC 6992: Filaments of the Veil Nebula
 APOD (2003-01-18) – Filaments in the Cygnus Loop
 APOD (1999-07-25) – Shockwaves in the Cygnus Loop (and underlying HST photo)
 Cygnus Loop HST Photo Release  – Bill Blair (Johns Hopkins University)
 Photo combining optical and X-ray data  – Bill Blair (Johns Hopkins University)
  Bill Blair  (Johns Hopkins University) – Overview photo of Cygnus Loop and Veil Nebula
 
 Veil Nebula at Constellation Guide

17840905
033b
Cygnus (constellation)
NGC objects
Supernova remnants